Harry Hays Morgan Jr. (April 25, 1898 – July 8, 1983) was an American diplomat, society figure and actor. He is most notable as the brother of Gloria Morgan Vanderbilt and uncle of Gloria Vanderbilt.

Early life and diplomatic career

Morgan was born April 25, 1898, in Horgen, Switzerland, to Henry Hays Morgan Sr. (1860–1933), an American diplomat, who served as U.S. consul general at Buenos Aires, Argentina; Berlin, Germany; Amsterdam, Netherlands; Havana, Cuba; and Brussels, Belgium. and his Peruvian born wife, Laura Delphine Kilpatrick (1877–1956). Morgan's father was the son of Louisiana planters, his mother was the daughter of U.S. Civil War General and diplomat Hugh Judson Kilpatrick.  Morgan was raised primarily in Europe, one of four children including  sisters Consuelo Morgan Thaw, Gloria Morgan Vanderbilt and Thelma Furness, Viscountess Furness and two half-sisters from his father's first marriage who remained in the United States. He graduated from Columbia University in 1919. 
He followed in his father's footsteps entering the diplomatic corps as U.S. Vice Consul at Glasgow, Scotland and later Brussels, Belgium and Vienna, Austria.

Film career
Morgan began a foray into acting in 1943, first appearing in an uncredited role in Lets Face It.  Morgan would go on to appear in 27 films between 1943 and 1948 including Ivy, The Snake Pit and Uncertain Glory.

Personal life

Morgan was married three times.

First in 1923 in New York to Ivor Elizabeth O'Connor (1901–1937), the Parisian born daughter of Dallas Banking magnate James C. O'Connor and Ivor Branch Tate, a sister of former Dallas mayor J. Waddy Tate and descendants of William Thornton. O'Connor was formerly married to Rembert D. Trezevant. O'Connor and Morgan divorced at Paris in 1927.  Despite having divorced Morgan in 1927, she testified in 1936 on behalf of her former sister-in-law, Gloria Morgan Vanderbilt during the custody trial of Gloria Vanderbilt. O'Connor died in Antibes, France in 1937 at age 36. O'Connor left a large estate which included stock, cash and real estate primarily in Dallas, where her land holdings included the property which eventually became Neiman Marcus and an interest in The First National Bank of Dallas. Much of her property was divested into 'Ivor O'Connor Morgan Trust' which provides benefit to children medicine at Dallas area hospitals and for the care of dogs.

Second in 1932 in Baltimore to Edith Churchill Gordon (1900–1948), the Philadelphia-born daughter of James Lindsay Gordon,  a Virginia born prominent New York attorney and Emily Adele Schlichter. Gordon's maternal grandfather was Isaac Schlichter, president of Schlichter Jute Cordage Company and Frankford Hospital, her paternal great grandfather was William F. Gordon a prominent nineteenth century Virginian politician. Gordon was previously married to Paul Mitchell Arnold.  Gordon and Morgan had one child together, Thelma Gloria Consuelo Morgan (born December 17, 1933, at Paris, France). She died at age 48 in 1948 in Los Angeles after a two-year illness.  Thelma Gloria Consuelo Morgan married Ian McKenzie Pringle on May 14, 1953 and had two children, a son, Charles McKenzie Pringle and a daughter, Susan McKenzie Pringle Eckel.  Consuelo Pringle (née Thelma Gloria Consuelo Morgan) divorced Ian Pringle in 1962; Ian McKenzie Pringle later died at the age of 54, murdered at his home in Ocho Rios, Jamaica, West Indies on February 7, 1987.  Consuelo Morgan later married Jackson (Jack) W. Moore in New York City, NY on June 11, 1965.  Consuelo Moore and Jack Moore had one son, Jackson Wyatt Moore, Jr.  Jack W. Moore (1915–1984) died at the age of 69 in 1984; his wife Consuelo Morgan Moore (1933–2014) died at the age of 80 in 2014; both are interred at the Columbarium at Arlington National Cemetery.

Third in 1949 to Ruth Broadbent Castor (Mar. 27, 1906 in Philadelphia – Jun. 21, 1994 in Lucerne), the Philadelphia-born daughter of William Bruce Castor (1874–1938), president of American Coffee and a graduate of the University of Pennsylvania, and Emily Buckley Broadbent (1880–1957) a Philadelphia socialite and graduate of Vassar College, and granddaughter of Samuel Martin Broadbent, a prominent Philadelphia lawyer, businessman and politician who was a graduate of Princeton University and the University of Pennsylvania. Her other grandfather was Pennsylvania Congressman George A. Castor. She was married to Thomas Francis Bayard III (1902–1983), the son of Delaware Senator Thomas F. Bayard Jr. from 1928 to their divorce in 1944 and had two children. Morgan and Castor married on April 4, 1949, in London, and remained married to Morgan's death. Castor died 1994 in Lucerne, Switzerland.

Morgan first retired to Majorca, Spain, and later Barcelona, Spain, where he died July 8, 1983.

Filmography

References

1898 births
1983 deaths
20th-century American male actors
American people of Chilean descent
American male film actors